John of Beaumont (1288 – 11 March 1356) was a younger brother of count William III of Holland.  He was the lord of Beaumont and count of Soissons by virtue of his marriage.

Life 
He was born in 1288 as John of Hainault, 4th son of John II, Count of Holland and Philippa of Luxembourg. He was the brother of William I of Hainault (III of Holland) and Alice of Hainault, among others. 

When his uncle John I, Count of Holland died in 1299, he left behind no descendants. As a result, his father inherited the county of Holland and Zeeland as John II, Count of Holland through his mother Adelaide of Holland. From then on Hainault and Holland were in a personal union. John of Hainault bought the heerlijkheid (comparably to the English Barony) of Beaumont, located in the southern Netherlands, for his son.

Count John II of Holland died in 1304 and was succeeded by his eldest son William III of Holland. On 21 June 1308, John received from his brother all the possessions of Gerard van Velsen, Willem van Zanden and Gerard Craaitenhout. This included the heerlijkheid Noordwijk and Beverwijk. On 23 July 1313 Noordwijk and Beverwijk were raised to hoge heerlijkheid (literally: high barony), which placed them amongst the most important fiefs in Holland. In 1316 John became lord of Tholen. Goes also came into his possession after it was taken from the Borssele family. His most important residences were Beaumont and the castle of Schoonhoven in the southern Netherlands. In 1340 he founded a Carmelite monastery in Schoonhoven.

John married Margaret of Soissons, which gave him the title of Count of Soissons. John and Margaret had five children:
 Jeanne of Hainault, married first to Louis II, Count of Blois, (three sons), and second to William I, Marquis of Namur, no issue
 John, Canon of Cambrai
 William, Canon of Cambrai, Beauvais and Le Mans
 Amalrik, Canon of Cambrai, Dole and Tours
 Reinout, Canon of Cambrai.
John often replaced his absent brother as governor of Holland. In 1326 he led an expedition to England, through which king Edward II of England was driven out and replaced by king Edward III. In 1340 he was regent of Holland and Zeeland for his nephew, count William IV of Holland for a short time. In 1345 he led an expedition to Friesland together with William IV. At the battle of Warns William IV was killed by the frisians while John of Beaumont barely managed to escape. He claimed the right of succession to the three counties, but eventually the succession was awarded to the sister of count William IV. As a result, John left the Netherlands and travelled to France, and he was present at the Battle of Crecy. Here his son-in-law Louis II, Count of Blois was killed. This made his grandson John II, Count of Blois heir to the expensive possessions in Holland and Zeeland. Afterwards John resided at the court of Margaret of Burgundy

John had a bastard son for whom he bought the heerlijkheid Treslong in Picardie. From this son descended the Bloys of Treslong.

He died on 11 March 1356.

Bloys of Treslong 
Bloys of Treslong is a family that descended from a bastard son of John of Beaumont. The Bloys' of Treslong included four flag-officers in the Dutch marine.

 Willem Bloys van Treslong (1529–1594), a captain of the Gueux de mer
 Jacob Arnout Bloys of Treslong (1756–1826), also called Jacob Arnold Bastingius, was a Secretary-General of the Dutch Navy
 Johan Arnold Bloys of Treslong (1757–1824). Schout-bij-nacht at the Battle of Kamperduin.
 Jhr. William Otto Bloys of Treslong (1765–1837), an uncle of Johan Arnold.
 Cornelius Ysaac Bloys of Treslong (1763–1826) made it to Captain in the Batavian and Royal Dutch Navy

Ships named after Bloys of Treslong include

 HNLMS Bloys van Treslong, a Dutch frigate of the Kortenaer class.

Ancestry

In fiction
John is a character in Les Rois maudits (The Accursed Kings), a series of French historical novels by Maurice Druon.

Sir John of Hainault is a character in Edward II, a play by Christopher Marlowe.

Notes

References

 Vaderlandsch woordenboek , Jacobus Kok, 1789.

1288 births
1356 deaths
John of Beaumont
Medieval Dutch nobility
13th-century people of the Holy Roman Empire
14th-century people of the Holy Roman Empire